Lõuka is a village in Tõstamaa Parish, Pärnu County, in southwestern Estonia. It is located just east of Tõstamaa, the administrative centre of the municipality. Lõuka has a population of 50 (as of 1 January 2011).

References

Villages in Pärnu County